opened in Morioka, Iwate Prefecture, Japan in 1980. The collection relates to the geology, natural history, archaeology, history, and folklore of Iwate Prefecture.

See also

 Mutsu Province
 List of Historic Sites of Japan (Iwate)
 List of Cultural Properties of Japan - paintings (Iwate)
 Iwate Museum of Art

References

External links
  Iwate Prefectural Museum

Morioka, Iwate
Museums in Iwate Prefecture
Museums established in 1980
1980 establishments in Japan
Prefectural museums